Mona Barthel and Sabine Lisicki were the defending champions but Lisicki decided not to participate.  Barthel played alongside Eva Birnerová, but lost in the first round to alternates Antonia Lottner and Anna Zaja.

Sara Errani and Roberta Vinci won the title, defeating Cara Black and Sania Mirza in the final, 6–2, 6–3.

Seeds

  Sara Errani /  Roberta Vinci (champions)
  Cara Black /  Sania Mirza (final)
  Anastasia Pavlyuchenkova /  Katarina Srebotnik (first round)
  Andrea Hlaváčková /  Lucie Šafářová (withdrew because of Hlaváčková's viral illness)

Draw

Draw

References
 Main Draw

Porsche Tennis Grand Prixandnbsp;- Doubles
2014 Doubles